Filiz is a common feminine Turkish given name. In Turkish, "Filiz" means "Blossom" and/or "to Flower".

Given name
 Filiz Ahmet (born 1981), Macedonian-Turkish stage and screen actress
 Filiz Akın (born 1943), Turkish film actress
 Filiz Ali (born in 1937), Turkish pianist  and musicologist
 Filiz Dinçmen (born 1939), First Turkish female Ambassador to a foreign country
 Filiz Hyusmenova (born 1966), Bulgarian politician of Turkish descent and Member of the European Parliament
 Filiz İşikırık (born 1993), Turkish footballer
 Filiz Kadoğan (born 1982), Turkish shot putter
 Filiz Kocaman (born 1985), Turkish volleyball player
 Filiz Koç (born in 1986), Turkish-German footballer, model and sports reporter
 Filiz Koçali (born 1958), Turkish politician
 Filiz Polat (born 1978), Turkish-German politician
 Filiz Taçbaş (born 1964), Turkish actress and former national tennis player
 Filiz Vural, Turkish beauty contestant and Miss Europe 1971

Surname
 Atalay Filiz, Turkish murderer and fugitive

Turkish feminine given names